The Captain's Wife is a public house in the former fishing hamlet of Swanbridge in Sully, between Barry and Penarth, Vale of Glamorgan, south Wales. The pub was established in 1977 from a row of three sea houses. Notable smuggling operations and dove culling once took place here and a tunnel connected the sea to what was known as Sully House. It takes its name from the wife of a sea captain who lived here and buried her in a nearby wood rather than confessing to her dying aboard his ship. The body of the wife was originally kept in a box that was mistaken for treasure and stolen. Today the Spinney Park Holiday and Leisure Park surrounds the pub.

Recent history
In 2002 the owners of the pub imposed parking charges for people coming to the pub and beach. By January 2003, the scheme had been dropped. On 26 November 2019 the pub’s owners were criticised for closing up a historic dovecote.

References

Pubs in the Vale of Glamorgan
1977 establishments in Wales